Uzomathis is a monotypic moth genus of the family Noctuidae. Its only species, Uzomathis dissensa, is found in French Guiana. Both the genus and the species were first described by Schaus in 1916.

References

Herminiinae
Monotypic moth genera